Yashwant Jadhav is an Indian politician and Shiv Sena leader from Mumbai, Maharashtra. 
He is  the leader of the House in Brihanmumbai Municipal Corporation.

He had worked on several committees in the municipal corporation such as Standing committee, Market and Garden Committee, Civil Works Committee etc.

Positions held
 1997: Elected as corporator in Brihanmumbai Municipal Corporation
 2007: Re-elected as corporator in Brihanmumbai Municipal Corporation
 2008: Elected as Chairman of Market and Garden Committee 
 2011 Onwards: Deputy Leader, Shiv Sena 
 2017: Re-elected as corporator in Brihanmumbai Municipal Corporation 
 2017: Appointed as leader of the House in Brihanmumbai Municipal Corporation
 2018: Elected as Standing Committee Chairman Brihanmumbai Municipal Corporation

References

External links
 Shiv Sena official website 

Living people
21st-century Indian politicians
Shiv Sena politicians
Marathi politicians
Year of birth missing (living people)